The Riverside Miniature Railway (RMR) is situated in Riverside Park, in St Neots, Cambridgeshire. Founded by Ivan Hewlett, the railway is run on a not-for-profit, community basis.

History
The Club was Started in April 2016  with the Railway opened in July 2017.

Gauges
The track is 7 1/4 in gauge railway (184mm) with an additional rail offering a 5 in gauge railway (127mm) as well. It is also possible to run G scale trains on the track due to a coincidence of the rail head thickness and spacing of the 7 1/4 in and 5” in rails.

See also
 Ridable miniature railway

References

Miniature railways in the United Kingdom